Bruno de Cessole (born 23 August 1950 in Nice) is a French writer and literary critic.

Biography 
The son of General Raymond de Cessole and Françoise Laubiès, Bruno de Cessole is a journalist for Le Figaro, L'Express, Le Point, a literary critic at Les Nouvelles littéraires and Les Lettres Françaises, as well as director of the Revue des deux Mondes.

In 2009, his novel L'Heure de la fermeture dans les jardins d'Occident won the prix des Deux Magots.

In 2015, he was awarded the Prix Henri-Gal for Literature of the Académie française for his entire body of work.

In early 2016, after the purchase of the newspaper by Étienne Mougeotte, Charles Villeneuve and Iskandar Safa, he left Valeurs actuelles.

Married to Béatrice Delettrez, a Professor of Law, he is the father of two sons and two daughters.

Works

Novels 
2008: , Prix des Deux Magots 2009 
2009:

Essays 
1994: 
1997: 
1998! 
1999: 
2001: 
2002: 
2002: 
2006: 
2010: 
2011: 
2014:

Notes and references 
Notes

References

External links 
 Bruno de Cessole : Le déclin politique de la France est inséparable de son déclin littéraire on Philitt
 Bruno de Cessole on France Culture
 Bruno de Cessole on Babelio (+ podcast)
 Bruno de Cessole : Le nihilisme fait le lit du terrorisme actuel on Jeune Afrique
 Bruno de Cessole on the site of the Académie française

20th-century French journalists
21st-century French journalists
French literary critics
21st-century French writers
Prix des Deux Magots winners
1950 births
People from Nice
Living people